Schleger is a surname. Notable people with the surname include:

 Hans Schleger (1898–1976), German-English graphic designer
 Shane Schleger (born 1977), American poker player
 Walter Schleger (1929–1999), Austrian footballer

See also
Schlager (surname)
Schlegel